Australia is set to participate in the Eurovision Song Contest 2023 in Liverpool, United Kingdom, with the song "Promise", written by Alex Canion, Ashley Doodkorte, Daniel Estrin, Scott Kay, and Simone Dow. The song is performed by Voyager. The Australian broadcaster Special Broadcasting Service (SBS) internally selected the Australian entry for the contest. The song and artist were officially revealed by SBS as the Australian entrant on 21 February 2023.

On 17 November 2015, the EBU announced that SBS had been invited to participate in the 2016 contest and that Australia would once again take part. In 2015, Australia was guaranteed a spot in the final of the contest and was allowed to vote during both semi-finals and the final; however, from the 2016 contest and onwards, Australia would have to qualify to the final from one of two semi-finals and could only vote in the semi-final in which the nation was allocated to compete.

Australia is drawn to compete in the second semi-final of the Eurovision Song Contest which will take place on 11 May 2023.

Background 

Special Broadcasting Service (SBS) has broadcast the Eurovision Song Contest since 1983, and the contest has gained a cult following over that time, primarily due to the country's strong political and cultural ties with Europe. Paying tribute to this, the 2014 contest semi-finals included an interval act featuring Australian singer Jessica Mauboy. Australian singers have also participated at Eurovision as representatives of other countries, including Olivia Newton-John, two-time winner Johnny Logan ( and), Gina G (United Kingdom), and Jane Comerford as lead singer of Texas Lightning.

Tying in with the goal of Eurovisionto showcase "the importance of bringing countries together to celebrate diversity, music and culture", the 2015 theme of "Building Bridges", and arguing that they could not hold "the world's biggest party" to celebrate the 60th edition of Eurovision without inviting Australia, the EBU announced on 10 February 2015 that the country would compete at that year's edition as a special guest participant. Along with the "Big 5" (France, Germany, Italy, Spain and the United Kingdom), and the host country of Austria, Australia was given automatic entry into the final to "not reduce the chances" of the semi-final participants. On 17 November 2015, the EBU announced that SBS had been invited to participate in the 2016 contest and that Australia would once again take part, however they would have to qualify for the final from one of two semi-finals and could only vote in the semi-final in which the nation was competing. On 12 February 2019, SBS signed a contract securing Australia's spot at the contest until 2023. In , Australia was represented by Sheldon Riley and the song "Not the Same". The country ended in fifteenth place in the final with 125 points. On 20 October 2022, SBS confirmed Australia's participation in the 2023 contest.

Before Eurovision

Internal selection 
SBS announced in November 2022 that the Australian entry for the Eurovision Song Contest 2023 would be selected internally, foregoing the use of the national final Eurovision – Australia Decides which had been held since 2019, with SBS stating, "Over the past few months, we have been exploring ways we could deliver the event to Australian audiences next year. However, a variety of factors contributed to us coming to this decision."

On 21 February 2023, SBS revealed that the band Voyager was selected as the Australian entrant for the 2023 contest with their song "Promise". The band had finished runner-up in Eurovision – Australia Decides the year prior with the song "Dreamer".

At Eurovision 
According to Eurovision rules, all nations with the exceptions of the host country and the "Big Five" (France, Germany, Italy, Spain and the United Kingdom) are required to qualify from one of two semi-finals in order to compete for the final; the top ten countries from each semi-final progress to the final. The European Broadcasting Union (EBU) split up the competing countries into six different pots based on voting patterns from previous contests, with countries with favourable voting histories put into the same pot. On 31 January 2023, an allocation draw was held, which placed each country into one of the two semi-finals, and determined which half of the show they would perform in. Australia has been placed into the second semi-final, to be held on 11 May 2023, and has been scheduled to perform in the second half of the show.

References

External links 

 

Countries in the Eurovision Song Contest 2023
Eurovision
Eurovision
Australia in the Eurovision Song Contest